The Dr. William J. Mayo House was built in 1916.  The house showcases a unique combination of Renaissance Revival and English Tudor styles.  The 24,000 square foot home contains 47 rooms on 6 floors.  Also known as the Mayo Foundation House, it was listed on the U.S. National Register of Historic Places in 1975.  It was a home of Dr. William James Mayo (1861–1939), one of seven founders of the Mayo Clinic.  It was donated by Dr. Mayo in 1938 to serve as a meetingplace for the Mayo Foundation, and today is commonly called the Foundation House.

References

External links
 
 An Overlooked Tribute for Dr. William Worrall Mayo - stained glass window placed in the William J. Mayo House

Houses completed in 1916
Houses in Olmsted County, Minnesota
Houses on the National Register of Historic Places in Minnesota
National Register of Historic Places in Olmsted County, Minnesota